Tapado is a seafood soup served in Central American countries such as Guatemala and Honduras. It uses coconut milk and seafood as well as plantains. Within these countries, tapado is associated with the Garifuna community.

References

Soups
Seafood dishes
Foods containing coconut
Plantain dishes
Central American cuisine
Belizean cuisine
Honduran cuisine
Guatemalan cuisine